The Erie Wave were a professional basketball franchise based in Erie, Pennsylvania from 1990–1992. The team played its inaugural season in the World Basketball League, which folded before the schedule ended.

The Wave cheerleading squad was known as the "Eriesistibles".

The Wave played its home games at the Louis J. Tullio Arena.

Sources
History of The World Basketball League | apbr.org

World Basketball League teams
Defunct basketball teams in Pennsylvania
1990 establishments in Pennsylvania
1992 disestablishments in Pennsylvania
Sports in Erie, Pennsylvania
Basketball teams established in 1990
Sports clubs disestablished in 1992